Rourkela is a planned city located in the northern district Sundargarh of Odisha, India. It is the third-largest Urban Agglomeration in Odisha after Bhubaneswar and Cuttack. The city is also popularly known as Ispat Nagar and Steel City of Odisha as well. One of the largest integrated steel plant set up with German collaboration Known as Rourkela Steel Plant, of Steel Authority of India Limited (SAIL). It also has one of the premier national level technical institute known as National Institutes of Technology (NIT Rourkela). Every year, on 3 March Rourkela Day has been celebrated.

The city has been selected as smart city in the third phase of the National Smart Cities Mission on 20 September 2016, which is to drive economic growth and improve the quality of life of people by enabling local area development. Rourkela has been declared India's Fastest Moving City (East Zone 2–10 Lakh). Rourkela is third largest city of Odisha state & categorised as a Tier-2 city.

History 
The name Rourkela originates from the local language of Sadri which means "Your Village" (Rour = Your & Kela comes from the word "Kila" which means Village). It comes under Sundergarh district of the Indian state of Odisha.

The twin towns of Rourkela and Fertilizer Township, as well as their developed periphery, are located in areas that were once covered by dense forests. These forests were once a favourite hunting ground for the kings in the past. Then railway station of Rourkela was within the revenue village of Mahulpali.

India's first public sector steel plant facility was established in Rourkela with the help of German businesses Krupp and Demag. In the late 1950s and early 1960s, the town was the largest German colony outside Germany.

There was a village called Durgapur in between Rourkela and Panposh stations. The construction of the sub-divisional court building was started in 1945 at the village Durgapur. Hence the nearby hills were also known as Durgapur Pahada (Durgapur Hills).  Today, it is known as Uditnagar. As a result, the two railway stations of Panposh and Rourkela came into recognition.

Following India's independence, Pandit Jawaharlal Nehru, the first Prime Minister of India, wanted to make India an industrialized state in Soviet model of social development; giving wings to his dreams, Sri Biju Pattanaik convinced Pandit Nehru to consider the location of Rourkela for setting up a steel plant. The mineral-rich zone of Rourkela intersected by the rivers Brahmani, Koel and Sankha from two sides was aptly chosen for the same.

The preliminary survey for the steel plant at Rourkela was started in 1952 and the Government of Odisha issued a gazette notification on 16 February 1954. In accordance with the notification, the Government of Odisha acquired an area of about 80 square miles around Rourkela for the purpose of Steel Plant. The German private companies Krupp and Demag came forward to provide financial and technical help for the proposed steel plant at Rourkela. Krupp built Rourkela Steel Plant drawing from experience from its own works in Essen, Germany. The technical experts of the company advised the Government of India as well as the Government of Odisha for acquiring more land. As a result, a further area of 32 square kilometres was acquired out of 31 revenue villages. Almost 13,000 people in 2,424 families lost their dwelling. Later further  of land were acquired out of 31 revenue villages for the construction of Mandira Dam, a water embankment. Moreland was requisitioned for the purpose of constructing railway lines to Hatia and Barsuan. The construction of the Bondamunda Railway junction required the further acquisition of land which resulted in 20,000 people's displacement from their habitat. Though there was initial discontentment among the tribals about the land acquisition the authority largely resolved the land dispute, as many of the tribals were provided employment and accommodation. The displaced tribals were relocated to places such as Jalda, Jhirpani, Bisra, and Bondamunda. Their new settlement even extended beyond the river Koel.

Thousands of technical personnel from West Germany came to Rourkela to extend their technical assistance. Some of these Germans came with their family and their small diaspora created the 'Indo-German Club' to socialise. The club exists today with a well-stocked library known as Max Muller library. There are a plethora of local stories of Germans social encounters with tribals (local Adivasis) and people from other parts of India who had relocated themselves to Rourkela for employment. A large part of this population was from coastal and western Odisha who were trained by the German workforce to adapt to the steel plant's technology rigour. The steel plant, which was hugely surrounded by forest, many times witnessed wild animals straying into the plant area. A royal Bengal tiger's lugubrious death in the steel plant's massive blast furnace is a part of the city's folklore. There were also tales about the disappearance of Germans in the nearby Vedvyas cave and the dread whirlpool of river Koel. The river still accounts for human casualty as some day-trippers wade into the water unaware of the maelstrom.

Geography
The area of Rourkela is 200 square kilometres approximately. Being situated on the Howrah-Mumbai rail track, Rourkela had an added advantage of the steel plant being set up there. Red and laterite soils are found here which are quite rich in minerals. The area near Rourkela is rich in iron-ore hence a steel plant is situated in Rourkela. Bolani and Barsuan are the two most prominent mines situated near the town. Rourkela is situated in a hilly region. A small hill range named Durgapur Pahad runs through the heart of the city dividing it into plant area and the steel township. The name "Durgapur" comes from an old village that existed at the foothills long time ago before the plant was set up. The South Koel River and Sankha rivers meet at Vedvyas, Rourkela and flow as a single river called Brahmani.

City layout

The Rourkela city is divided into two separate townships under the Census of India as Steel Township and Civil Township. The Residential quarter's colony of Rourkela Steel Plant having eighteen sectors on record is called Steel Township and the other part is called Civil Township. One smaller township Fertiliser was renamed sector-22, as this township is within the purview of SAIL.

Steel Township is a modern industrial habitation mostly residential quarters, characterised by extensive green coverage under the Steel Plant Administration. A number of artistically crafted monuments not only add significant grace to the landscape of the township but also showcase the innovative usage of steel for creating objects of art.

The 16 km long Ring Road, connects eighteen sectors and some major parts of the steel city including Chhend Colony, Civil Township, Udit Nagar, Basanti Nagar, Koel Nagar, Jagda, Jhirpani, Panposh, Fertiliser Township, Hamirpur, and Vedvyas.

Climate
Rourkela has a tropical climate and receives high rainfall during Southwest monsoon (June – September) and retreating Northeast monsoon (December – January). Average annual rainfall ranges between 160 and 200 cm. The minimum and maximum temperatures are in the range of 5 C to 49.7 C with a mean minimum and maximum temperature range of 12.0 C to 31.5 C during coldest and hottest months. Thirty six percent of the geographical area of the district has semi-evergreen or tropical dry deciduous forest.

Economy

Rourkela is the industrial capital of Odisha (Formerly Orissa). Rourkela, with a population of 6 lakhs and the first place in India to house the 1.8 million ton integrated steel plant, joins the IT world through STPI.

Location-wise it is integrated with infrastructure such as rail, road, air, abundant natural mineral resources such as water, land, power, rich pool of skilled people, top-rated social and civic infrastructure for reposing, and Universal friendliness. These factors have attracted many industrialists to choose Rourkela as their destination. Rourkela has never faced any sort of natural calamity whatsoever, except for some heavy rainfall. STPI has already set up and dedicated earth station in Rourkela to welcome the IT entrepreneurs for their uprising destination. 

As Rourkela has tag as Steel City and house of many heavy industries like Steel, Sponge Iron, Chemical, Fabrication, Cement etc. There are number of small to large manufacturing industries for economic activity in and around the city.
Steel Authority of India - Rourkela Steel Plant (RSP)
 NTPC-SAIL Power Company Limited, (NSPCL) Rourkela
 OCL India Limited in Rajgangpur
 Larsen & Toubro Fabrication Plant in Kansbahal
 Kalunga Industrial Estate
 Bondamunda-Rourkela Locomotive Sheds (Indian Railway)
 <small>'' Software Technology Parks of India 'STPI, Rourkela</small>

Civic Administration

The steel city is divided mainly into two separate townships under Census of India as Steel Township and Civil Township. The Steel Township is a modern industrial habitation under the Steel Plant Administration, while the other sections  are under the Rourkela Municipal Corporation. Some rural areas of South Rourkela are managed by the Jalda Panchayat.

 Rourkela Municipal Corporation was declared as Municipal Corporation on November, 2014. The civic body that governs the over all large section of Rourkela and look after the civic and infrastructural needs of the citizens.Rourkela Development Authority was created by the Govt. of Odisha in the year 1995. The main objective of RDA is to under take works pertaining to Construction of Housing Colony, Shopping Complex, Industrial Estate and to provide public amenities also undertake for Improvement & clearance of slums and re-development programmes in a planned manner.
 Rourkela Smart City Limited city has been selected as smart city in the third phase of smart city list in September 2016. The objective is to promote city that provide core infrastructure and give a decent quality of life to its citizens, a clean and sustainable environment and apply ‘smart solutions'.

Central Water Commission has its sub-divisional headquarters near Panposh.

 Demographics 

 India census, Rourkela Metropolitan Area had a population of 536,450. Males constitute 54% of the population and females 46%. Rourkela has an average literacy rate of 75%, higher than the national average of 59.5% male literacy is 81%, and female literacy is 69%. In Rourkela, 12% of the population is under 6 years of age.
 Density of Population – 6,696 per km2. approx.
 Sex Ratio – 835 Female per 1000 male.
 Per capita income – Highest in Odisha.
 Population (Census 2011) – 552,970 where as Rourkela Industrial Township (210,412) & Rourkela Town (273,217).
 Main Habitations in Rourkela – Civil Township, Koelnagar, Chhend Colony, Uditnagar, Steel Township (Eighteen Sectors), Fertiliser Township, Industrial Estate, Basanti colony, Railway colony, Jhirpani, Jagda, Panposh, Vedavyas, Bondamunda, Bisra and Kalunga.

Transportation
 Road transportation 

Towards the end of 1946, most of the existing roads of the Sundargarh District were constructed. One National Highway i.e. (NH-143) passes through Rourkela which runs from Chas-Ranchi-Rourkela-Barkote-Banarpal – Junction with (NH-55). About 30  km of this highway passes through in and around Rourkela. Though the finalization of the project is awaited the planning for four linings of this highway is under consideration. One more National Highway i.e. NH – 215 which runs from Rajamunda (in Sundergarh district) to Panikoili in Jajpur district.

Other than this the SH-10 which runs from Rourkela to Sambalpur is another good road used in a large way particularly after its renovation and up gradation in 1995. This highway has recently been upgraded to a four-lane highway under the Biju Expressway project. There are a number of other departmental roads in and around Rourkela stretched in different parts.

From a civic point of view, the Steel City consists of two parts i.e. Steel Township and Civil Township. While the ring road constructed by Rourkela Steel Plant Authority which has surrounded the Steel Township the other part of the ring road is Civil Township. The Steel Township roads are also maintained by the RSP authority. There are a number of daily Bus Services from Rourkela to different parts of Orissa and also, a few, to neighboring states like Chhattisgarh and Jharkhand. There are a number of city buses plying daily on different routes in the city. The new Bus Terminus at Uditnagar, Rourkela constructed by Rourkela Development Authority caters to various demands of Bus services to different parts of the states. Other than the New Bus stand, there are a number of ticket booking counters in different parts of the city for the public to book tickets for various destinations. In 2014, Government of Odisha decided to build Biju Expressway stretching from Rourkela to Jagdalpur 

 Railways 
Rourkela Railway junction is situated on the Howrah-Mumbai line under Chakradharpur division of South-Eastern Railway. Apart from Rourkela Station, the other stations in Sundargarh District are Bondamunda, Panposh, Rajgangpur, Kalunga, Kansbahal, etc. The city is well connected through Railway to Howrah & Mumbai. Apart from this, the city enjoys direct connectivity to Delhi, Chennai, Bangalore, Ranchi, Ahmedabad, & Pune and other major city's' of India. Rourkela is a profit-generating junction of South-Eastern Railway. from Rourkela junction, one line also goes to Biramitrapur whereas two from Bondamunda towards Howrah and Hatia respectively. One more line goes from Bimalagarh to Kiriburu.

 Bondamunda Loco Shed: Two locomotive sheds, one for steam locomotives and the other for diesel locomotives, was set up in the  year 1950s. An electric locomotive shed was started in 1983 for accommodating WAM-4 locomotives, which accommodates 242 electric locomotives. New electric locomotive shed is under construction to expand & enhance capacity of 200 WAG-9 locomotives.

 Air Transport 

Rourkela Airport is a public airport serving Rourkela, Odisha, India. It is located near Chhend Colony, 6 kilometres west of the city centre.The airport's terminal is being upgraded to handle scheduled operations. Under UDAN scheme. The airport is capable of handling ATR-72 type aircraft, an apron for parking of two aircraft at a time and a general aviation terminal. The license for commercial usage of the airport was issued in January 2019. To handle commercial flights and traffic, the airport upgradation project involving expansion of the runway from 1,765 m to 1,930 m to handle larger aircraft, like the ATR-72 and De Havilland 8-400 aircraft, construction of a new apron, a parallel taxiway to the runway, a new passenger terminal building and a perimeter wall was taken up by the Airports Authority of India (AAI) at a cost of ₹ 64.24 crore, is underway

Health Care

There are a number of hospital facilities in Rourkela. People from different parts of Odisha and other states for seeking better health care access and treatment. Major medical facilities in the city are Ispat General Hospital, Jaiprakash Hospital, and Rourkela Govt. Hospital. 
 Ispat General Hospital
 Rourkela Government Hospital
 Super speciality Hospital 
 Shanti Memorial Hospital
 ESIC Model Hospital
 Sub Divisional Hospital, Panposh
 Lifeline Hospital
 Community Welfare Society Hospital
 Vesaj Patel Hospital
 Lions Eye Hospital
 Hi-Tech Medical College & Hospital
 Jaiprakash Hospital and Research Centre, Uditnagar
 Jaiprakash Hospital (Main Campus), Dayanand Nagar, Vedvyas

 Tourism & Recreation 

Rourkela has three major recreation parks in Steel Township area. These are Indira Gandhi Park, Jubilee Park, and Ispat Nehru Park Udyaan along with the recently inaugurated Community Park at Civil Township and many other small parks in Civil Township area.

Bhanja Bhaban (comprising the Bhanja Kala Kendra and the Library) and Civic Centre hosts the State level and National Level Drama, Fashion and Dancing competitions throughout the year.

Hanuman Vatika a sprawling campus of area surrounding of 13 acres. statue of Hanuman is constructed with the height of 75 feet in the year of 1994. There are also a number of temples named as Bata Managla, Binayak, Vaishnodevi, Sarala, Dwadash Linga, Siva, Santoshi Maa, Maa Laxmi etc. constructed here for the devotees. Because of beauty scenario and green area, number of general visitors came to this place every day here.

The city has several cinemas, including Konark, UMA, Apsara, Deepak and Razzaq (presently all of them being turned into multiplex). A couple of multiplexes however have started recently, namely PSR Cinemas, Panposh Road and Cineplex, Shanti Towers. The latest attraction of the city is the new PVR multiplex opened inside the Forum Galleria mall in Civil Township. Several food courts like Ambagan Food Court, Sector 5 VIP Market, Sector 16 & 18 area street foods, Koel Nagar NAC Market, Khana Khazana, 7 AM & Max Restaurant and Bakery, The Cakery Bakery and Paris Bakery in New Rourkela, Green Chillyz behind Ambagan are some of the most visited places.Luxury shopping Mall are Forum Galleria Mall in Civil Township &  CROSSROAD Mall is already started with Pantaloons, KFC, PizzaHut, Skechers etc. and other great brands available for shopping. There are many Shopping Malls under construction like Fe2 Arcade (Sector 5), Pluto Plaza in Chhend.

Major Tourist Destinations in and around Rourkela are as follows:
 Hanuman Vatika, Civil Township
Indira Gandhi Park,
Jubilee Park
 Vedvyas (Vyas Cave & Mahadev Mandir)
 Ispat Nehru Park Udyaan
 Mandira Dam
Vaishnodevi Temple, Rourkela (Replica of Vaishnodevi Temple )
Khandadhar Waterfall
 Lagoon Park
 Pitamahal Dam
 Badalgiri Waterfall
 Ramakrishna Mission, Hamirpur, Sector-19
 Sri Sai Mandir, Vedvyas
 Tarkera Dam

Education

Rourkela is the educational, technical and medical research hub of Western Odisha and even students from all parts of Odisha and some parts of neighboring states Bihar, Jharkhand and West Bengal come here to pursue higher education. city houses many English medium schools which provide CBSE and ICSE certificates to their students.

There are ICSE-ISC board schools like Sri Aurobindo's Rourkela School, St. Paul's School, Mt. Carmel School, St. Joseph's Convent School, Ispat English Medium School, Indo English School, Chinmaya Vidyalaya(E.M.), MGM English Medium School, DeSouza's School, St. Thomas School, St. Mary's School, Loreto English School. Most of them are missionary based organizations run by licensee trustees. The students of various schools in Rourkela represent their schools in various national and international level competitions including IMO, IChO, and NASA.India to host Chemistry Olympiad | 33rd International Chemistry Olympiad. Hindu.com. Retrieved on 6 April 2013.

The CBSE board schools include Deepika English Medium School, Delhi Public School, Guru Nanak Public School (GNPS), Dayanand Anglo-Vedic (DAV) School and St. Arnold school. The Central government has its own Kendriya Vidyalaya in Sector-6 and in Bondamunda. It also has notable Odia medium schools like Chinmaya Vidyalaya, Saraswati Shishu Vidya Mandir (Sector-6), Ispat Vidyalaya (Sector 18) and Baji Rout High School.

Utkalmani Gopabandhu Institute of Engineering, Rourkela also called the UGIE is a State Governmental Diploma Engineering Institution in the western Zone of Odisha, which was established in 1962 under the Directorate of Technical Education and Training (DTET), Odisha.

Rourkela has a Hi-Tech Medical College and Hospital Rourkela and is the only city in Odisha to have a private medical college outside Bhubaneshwar. The local leaders have demanded a government medical college in Rourkela.

There are over 15 colleges for arts, science, and commerce streams under the Sambalpur University. Some of the famous ones are Government Autonomous College, Rourkela Municipal College, Ispat College, SG Women's College. There are also private engineering & Management colleges like Rourkela Institute of Management Studies (RIMS), DAMITS, Rourkela Institute of Technology (RIT), Kanak Manjari Institute of Pharmaceutical Sciences(KMIPS), Padmanava College of Engineering (PCE) these colleges come under the jurisdiction of Biju Patnaik University of Technology (BPUT) and the head office is located in Chennd, Rourkela.

Universities

National Institute of Technology Rourkela: NIT Rourkela is one of India's premier technical institute, and is recognised as an  Institute of National Importance. Its foundation stone was laid by the first Prime Minister of India, Jawaharlal Nehru in the year of 1961. It was granted autonomy in 2002 and now functions independently under the Ministry of Education. Research at the institute carried out at one of the high-tech collaborative centers, such as the Centre for Robotics and Space Technology Incubation Centre.

Biju Patnaik University of Technology: (BPUT) head-quarters in Rourkela came into being in November 2002 through an act of the Odisha state legislature and foundation stone was laid by A.P.J. Abdul Kalam, the hon’ble President of India. The main objective of university is to ensure a high quality of students coming out of the technical colleges through a common curriculum and uniform evaluation.

Sports
Hockey
The city becomes a sports hub with many stadiums and few sports academy in and around. The two stadiums are Biju Patnaik Hockey Stadium, with synthetic astroturf built by SAIL and Ispat Stadium that consist of a basketball ground, a chess hall, and a well-maintained volleyball ground nearby as well. The indoor stadium at Sector-20 hosts the badminton and Table Tennis events. The number of academy in the city has produced many nationally and internationally acclaimed Hockey players. The Ispat stadium and a number of game specific facilities from Odisha Govt. and SAIL have played a key role in honing the talents of the youngsters.

India's former captains Dilip Tirkey, Ignace Tirkey and Prabodh Tirkey, deep defender Lazarus Barla started their careers in Rourkela. Rourkela has special hockey hostels for kids, upbringing the next generation players with some of the best amenities. It has produced a few Arjuna Awardees, including Minati Mohapatra. Olympians of repute like Paralympian Roshan and Rachita Mistry are from this city. Former hockey player and 1972 Summer Olympics Bronze medal winner, Michael Kindo, also happens to be a current resident of the city. Indian national cricketer Sanjay Raul and the Under-19 world cup representative Chandrakant Barik play from this city. Pabitra Mohan Mohanty, the former national 'B' champion in chess and second only to Viswanathan Anand in national 'A' category is a resident of this city.

Stadiums

Rourkela has an International hockey stadium with synthetic astroturf which has been host to World Junior Hockey Championship and been a training centre to most of the international Hockey players of India. Ispat Stadium has been host for several Ranji Trophy matches and youth ODIs. The city has produced many reputed Ranji players in the recent times. RSP does promote various different sports like – Cycling, Boxing, Archery, Soccer and lots more.Sport Stadium Birsa Munda International Hockey Stadium 
 Biju Patnaik Hockey Stadium (Sector-5)
 Ispat Stadium (Sector-6)
 Indoor Stadium (Sector-20)
 Sports Hostel, Panposh
 Ispat Mini Stadium, Fertiliser Township (Sector-22)Sports PlayerHockey: Binita Toppo (female hockey)
 Dilip Tirkey
 Lazarus Barla
 Ignace Tirkey
 Prabodh Tirkey (younger brother of Ignace Tirkey)
 Birendra LakraOther sports:'''
 Rachita Mistry ( Sprinter )
 Natraj Behera ( Cricket )

Media
Rourkela City has a radio station of All India Radio (A.I.R) on FM Band 102.6 MHz since 24 June 1995. AIR Rourkela has one transmission from 06:00 AM to 11:10 PM daily. Other privately owned radio channels include Radio 92.7 BIG FM, Choklate 104 FM, 98.3 Tarang FM and 91.9 Sarthak FM. These channels broadcast Hindi and Odia film and non-film songs, talk shows and other entertainment programmes. Private Digital media channels include Rourkela Shines, Satya News Alert also operates from Rourkela to provide local news.

Festivals
Being a cosmopolitan city, Rourkela celebrates festivals such as Utkala Dibasa, Ram Navami, Pana Sankranti(Odia new year), Devasnan Purnima, Raja, Rath Yatra, Raji Karma Puja, Nuakhai, Sarna Puja, Durga Puja, Kali Puja, Chhat Puja, Kartik Purnima, Ganesh Puja, Laxmi Puja, Vishwakarma Puja, Deepawali, Dola Yatra, Holi, Bengali Nababarsha (Poila Boishak) etc.

The City Fest named as 1st Brahmani River Festival in its first edition was from 1 to 3 February 2019. It showcased the rich tribal heritage that is present in and around Rourkela and Sundargarh District.

Notable residents
 
 
 Lazarus Barla, Indian hockey player
 Natraj Behera, former Odisha cricket team captain
 Samir Dash, entrepreneur
 Debasish Ghose, Noted Academic, Professor at Indian Institute of Science
 C. P. Gurnani, CEO & Managing Director of Tech Mahindra
 Harish Hande, Magsaysay Award winner
 Michael Kindo, Indian hockey player and Olympic medalist
 Ramendra Kumar, award-winning children's fiction writer
 Rachita Mistry, Olympiad
 Bibhu Mohapatra, fashion designer, USA
 Mira Nair, film director and author
 Jual Oram, Current MP from Sundargarh, Chairman of Parliamentary Standing Committee on Defence and Former Union Minister for Tribal Affairs (2014–2019)
 Govinda Poddar, current Odisha cricket team captain
 Dilip Ray, MLA (Rourkela), founder of Mayfair group of hotels
 Biswapati Sarkar, writer and director
 Dilip Tirkey, former captain, Indian National Hockey Team
 Ignace Tirkey, former captain, Indian National Hockey Team
 Prabodh Tirkey, former captain, Indian National Hockey Team
 Amish Tripathi, author
 White Town, singer and musician, UK

References 

 
Sundergarh district
Cities and towns in Kosala
Company towns in India
1954 establishments in Orissa
Smart cities in India